Zali Breg is a small dispersed settlement northeast of Dobrovo in the Municipality of Brda in the Littoral region of Slovenia.

References

External links
Zali Breg on Geopedia

Populated places in the Municipality of Brda